Reza Zadeh is an American-Canadian-Iranian computer scientist and technology executive working on machine learning. He is adjunct professor at Stanford University and CEO of Matroid. He has served on the technical advisory boards of Databricks and Microsoft. 
His work focuses on machine learning, distributed computing, and discrete applied mathematics.

In Industry, to evaluate new ventures formed at the University of Toronto, Reza serves as a chief scientist of Machine Learning at the Rotman School of Management. His awards include a KDD Best Paper Award and the Gene Golub Outstanding Thesis Award at Stanford.

Work

Computer Vision 
The Princeton University ModelNet challenge is an object recognition competition to classify 3D Computer-aided design models into object categories. In 2016, Matroid was a leader in this competition and the relevant neural networks were integrated into the Matroid product.

In a collaboration with his own doctor at Stanford hospital, Reza's research team created a neural network to automatically detect Glaucoma in 3D optical coherence tomography images of the eyeball. The net surpassed human doctor performance and is providing diagnostic hints at the hospital.

In 2016, Reza founded Matroid, inc to commercialize computer vision research by building a product for industries such as manufacturing and industrial sensors. Matroid raised $13.5 million from New Enterprise Associates, Intel, and others.

Distributed Machine Learning 
Reza is a coauthor of Apache Spark, in particular its Machine Learning library, MLlib,. Through open source, Reza's work has been incorporated into industrial and academic cluster computing environments. He was an early technical advisor and employee at Databricks, the company commercializing Spark.

Recommender Systems 
Reza created the machine learning algorithm behind Twitter's Who-To-Follow project and subsequently released it to open source. During that time he also led research tracking earthquake damage via machine learning, gaining wide media attention as an example of real-time social information flow.

Personal 
Reza was born during the Iran–Iraq War in the under-siege city of Ahvaz. From there, his family emigrated to London, England where Reza grew up until age 17, after which he emigrated to Toronto, Canada, obtaining a degree from University of Waterloo. He frequently visited the US at age 18 to work on the Google Research team, and later moved to the US for a master's degree at Carnegie Mellon University and PhD at Stanford, all in Computer Science and Mathematics.

He holds three citizenships: Canadian, American, and Iranian. During confusion surrounding the 2017 travel ban, his pro-immigration stance stood as voice of protest to the Trump Administration's Anti-Immigration policies.

References

External links
Chinese translation of his PhD Dissertation by Xu Wenhao, November 2012
Website at Stanford

Year of birth missing (living people)
Living people
Stanford University alumni
University of Waterloo alumni
Canadian computer scientists
Iranian expatriate academics